The 2014 World Junior Ice Hockey Championship Division II was played in two groups of six teams each. In each group the first-placed team is promoted to a higher level, while the last-placed team is relegated to a lower level. Divisions II A and II B represent the fourth and the fifth tier of the World Junior Ice Hockey Championships.

Division II A

The Division II A tournament was played in Miskolc, Hungary, from 15 to 21 December 2013.

Participants

Final standings

Results
All times are local (CET – UTC+1).

Statistics

Top 10 scorers

Goaltending leaders
(minimum 40% team's total ice time)

Awards

Best Players Selected by the Directorate
 Goaltender:  Oliver Agoston
 Defenceman:  Kilian van Gorp
 Forward:  Daniel Bogdziul

Best players of each team selected by the coaches
  Luka Vukoja
  Daniil Seppenen
  Vilmos Gallo
  Daniel Bogdziul
  Tom Marx
  Huba Bors

Division II B
The Division II B tournament was played in Jaca, Spain, from 11 to 17 January 2014.

Participants

Final standings

Results
All times are local (CET – UTC+1).

Statistics

Top 10 scorers

Goaltending leaders
(minimum 40% team's total ice time)

Awards

Best Players Selected by the Directorate
 Goaltender:  Ignacio Garcia
 Defenceman:  Seo Yeongjun
 Forward:  Alejandro Carbonell

Best players of each team selected by the coaches
  James Byers
  Zhang Cheng
  Patricio Fuentes
  Bjorn Sigurdarson
  Seo Yeongjun
  Jovan Feher

References

External links
IIHF.com

World Junior Ice Hockey Championships - Division II, 2014
II
World Junior Ice Hockey Championships – Division II
International ice hockey competitions hosted by Hungary
International ice hockey competitions hosted by Spain
World Junior Ice Hockey Championships – Division II
World Junior Ice Hockey Championships – Division II